Khlong Tron is a watercourse of Thailand and part of the Chao Phraya River basin. It joins the Nan River in Uttaradit Province.

Tron